Charles Augustus Baylis (1902–1975) was an American philosopher and professor of philosophy at Brown University (1927–1949), University of Maryland (1949–1952), Duke University (1952–1970). He was the managing editor of the Journal of Symbolic Logic.

References

Further reading
 Fact, Value, and Perception: Essays in Honor of Charles A. Baylis, Duke University Press 1975

20th-century American philosophers
Philosophy academics
1902 births
1975 deaths
Duke University faculty
Philosophy journal editors
American logicians
Harvard University alumni
Brown University faculty